HMS Auricula was a  that served in the Royal Navy and was built by George Brown and Company in 1940. She was named after Auricula. Commissioned in 1941 and sunk by a mine on 6 May 1942.

Design and description
In early 1939, with the risk of war with Nazi Germany increasing, it was clear to the Royal Navy that it needed more escort ships to counter the threat from Kriegsmarine U-boats. One particular concern was the need to protect shipping off the east coast of Britain. What was needed was something larger and faster than trawlers, but still cheap enough to be built in large numbers, preferably at small merchant shipyards, as larger yards were already busy. To meet this requirement, the Smiths Dock Company of Middlesbrough, a specialist in the design and build of fishing vessels, offered a development of its 700-ton,  whale catcher Southern Pride. They were intended as small convoy escort ships that could be produced quickly and cheaply in large numbers. Despite naval planners' intentions that they be deployed for coastal convoys, their long range meant that they became the mainstay of Mid-Ocean Escort Force convoy protection during the first half of the war. The original Flowers had the standard RN layout, consisting of a raised forecastle, a well deck, then the bridge or wheelhouse, and a continuous deck running aft. The crew quarters were in the foc'sle while the galley was at the rear, making for poor messing arrangements.

The modified Flowers saw the forecastle extended aft past the bridge to the aft end of the funnel, a variation known as the "long forecastle" design. Apart from providing a very useful space where the whole crew could gather out of the weather, the added weight improved the ships' stability and speed and was retroactively applied to a number of the original Flower-class vessels during the mid and latter years of the war.

Construction and career
Auricula was laid down by George Brown and Company at their shipyard at Greenock, on 25 November 1939 and launched on 14 November 1940. She was commissioned on 5 March 1941.

HMS Auricula hit a mine at Courrier Bay, Madagascar on 5 May 1942 during the invasion of Madagascar. Her crew suffered minor injuries and were taken aboard the Polish hospital ship . On the next day, Auricula sank while under tow from the her hull breach.

References

Sources
 
 
 
 
 

 

Flower-class corvettes of the Royal Navy
1940 ships
Ships sunk by mines
World War II shipwrecks in the Indian Ocean